The 2009 NORCECA Beach Volleyball Circuit at Montelimar, was held October 28 - November 2, 2009 in Montelimar Beach, Managua, Nicaragua. It was the last leg of the NORCECA Beach Volleyball Circuit 2009.

Women's competition

Men's competition
Results on November 3, 2009

References

External links
 NORCECA
 BV Info

See also
 NORCECA Beach Volleyball Circuit 2009

Montelimar
Norceca Beach Volleyball Circuit (Montelimar), 2009